Codex Tischendorfianus IV – designated by Γ or 036 (in the Gregory-Aland numbering), ε 70 (von Soden) – is a Greek uncial manuscript of the Gospels, dated palaeographically to the 10th century (although 9th century is also possible). The manuscript is lacunose.

Description 

The codex contains portions of the four Gospels on 257 parchment leaves ( by ) in the Western order: Matthew, John, Luke, and Mark. The text of the codex is written in one column per page, 24 lines per page. The letters are large and lean to the left. The letters have breathings and accents.

There is also a division according to the smaller Ammonian Sections, with references to the Eusebian Canons (written below Ammonian Section numbers).

There are no itacistic errors.

Over the original breathings and accents some later scrawler has, in many places, put others, in a very careless fashion.

At the end of the Gospel of John it has subscription . Tischendorf, by the aid of Ant. Pilgrami's Calendarium chronologum medii potissimum aevi monumentis accommodatum (Vienna 1781), states that the only year between 800 and 950, with November 27 on a Thursday, was 844. 
The another possible year is 979.

 Lacunae
The text of the codex has some lacunae in Matthew and in Mark (lacks Matthew 5:31-6:16, 6:30-7:26, 8:27-9:6, 21:19-22:25; Mark 3:34-6:21); Luke and John are complete. It omits Matthew 16:2b–3.

 Additions 
In Matt. 27:49 codex contains added text: ἄλλος δὲ λαβὼν λόγχην ἒνυξεν αὐτοῦ τὴν πλευράν, καὶ ἐξῆλθεν ὕδορ καὶ αἷμα (the other took a spear and pierced His side, and immediately came out water and blood). This reading was derived from John 19:34 and occurs in other manuscripts of the Alexandrian text-type (א, B, C, L, 1010, 1293, pc, vgmss).

Text 
The Greek text of this codex is a representative of the Byzantine text-type. Aland placed it in Category V.

It is close textually to the codices 024, 026, 027, 047, 0130, 4, 251, 273, 440, 472, 485, 495, 660, 716, 1047, 1093, 1170, 1229, 1242, 1295, 1355, 1365, 1396, 1515, 1604. Hermann von Soden designated this group by I'. According to the Claremont Profile Method it represents textual family Kx in Luke 1, Luke 10, and Luke 20.

History 

One part of the codex was found by Tischendorf in an eastern monastery in 1853, another part in 1859. As a result, the codex is divided and housed in two places. 158 leaves were bought in 1855 and they are housed in the Bodleian Library (Auct. T. infr 2.2) in Oxford and 99 leaves of the codex are located now in the National Library of Russia (Gr. 33) in Saint Petersburg.

The Petersburgian leaves were described by Kurt Treu.

See also 

 List of New Testament uncials
 Textual criticism
 Biblical manuscript

References

Further reading 

 Constantin von Tischendorf, Anecdota sacra et profana (Leipzig: 1855), pp. 5–6.
 Constantin von Tischendorf, Notitia edit. Cod. Bibl. Sin, Leipzig 1860, p. 53.
 Kurt Treu, Die Griechischen Handschriften des Neuen Testaments in der USSR; eine systematische Auswertung des Texthandschriften in Leningrad, Moskau, Kiev, Odessa, Tbilisi und Erevan, T & U 91 (Berlin: 1966), pp. 41–43.

External links 
 Codex Tischendorfianus Γ (036): at the Encyclopedia of Textual Criticism
 MS. Auct. T. inf. 2. 2 in the Catalogue of Medieval Manuscripts in Oxford Libraries

Greek New Testament uncials
10th-century biblical manuscripts
Bodleian Library collection
Codex Tischendorfianus IV